Calvia is a genus of lady beetles in the  family Coccinellidae. There are about 10 described species in Calvia.

Species
These 10 species belong to the genus Calvia:
 Calvia championorum Booth, 1997
 Calvia chinensis (Mulsant, 1850)
 Calvia connexa Miyatake, 1985
 Calvia decemguttata (Linnaeus, 1767)
 Calvia muiri (Timberlake, 1943)
 Calvia paravinotata (Miyatake, 1959)
 Calvia quadrivittata (Miyatake, 1965)
 Calvia quatuordecimguttata (Linnaeus, 1758) (cream-spotted lady beetle)
 Calvia quindecimguttata (Fabricius, 1777)
 Calvia shirozui (Miyatake, 1965)

References

Further reading

External links
 

Coccinellidae
Coccinellidae genera